HMS Leander was a second class cruiser, name ship of the Royal Navy's first s. During a revolution in Panama in 1900, Leander helped protect the lives and property of foreign residents.

Design and construction

The Leander was built by Napier in Glasgow, being laid down in 1880, launched in 1882 and completed in 1885. The Leander class were originally designated as steel dispatch vessels, but were reclassified as second class cruisers before they were completed. The Leander had three masts and two funnels; she was square-rigged on the fore-mast and gaff-rigged on the two masts behind the funnels. She was armed with ten breech-loading (BL)  guns, 16 machine guns and four above-water torpedo tubes. Four of the machine guns were later replaced by four quick-firing (QF) 3-pounder guns.

After her sister ship 's trials, the Leander had her funnels raised  to improve the draught to the boilers. Once this was done, the Leander exceeded her designed speed. She was the only one of her class to have forced draught. The Leander was a good steamer, but a poor sea-boat with a heavy roll in some sea conditions.

Seagoing career

1885–1889

On 29 May 1885, Captain Martin J Dunlop arrived on board at Chatham and commissioned the ship. The first few days were spent first cleaning and then provisioning the ship. On 3 June, they tested the flooding arrangements of the magazines and shell rooms and found they were correct. On 5 June at 16:00, Leander was hauled out of the basin and proceeded under steam down the Medway in charge of the pilot and at 17:45 secured to the swinging buoy at Sheerness the engines using 5 tons 8 cwt (5.5 t) of coal and the ship a further 3 cwt (0.15 t); no coal was used distilling. One man fell overboard, and went on the sick list. On 6 June they took on board powder, shot and shell, and 300 lb of fresh beef and 200 lb of vegetables. On 8 June they swung the ship to adjust the compasses. On 9 June, the ship went out for gunnery practice, burning 26 tons 5 cwt (26.7 t) of coal for the engines and 6 cwt (0.3 t) for the ship. She fired 21 rounds from the 6-in BL; firing caused a number of breakages: 1 axial vent for a 6-in BL, the glass of two electric light projectors [searchlights], and the Pawl of Compressor of Admiralty Carriage.

Still secured to the buoy off Sheerness Dockyard, she received 90 lb of fresh vegetables and 182 lb fresh beef on 10 June. On 11 June, she was inspected by the Commander-in-Chief. Repairs in the engine room appeared to be complete by early afternoon, and fires were lighted in four boilers between 14:30 and 15:30; the ship prepared for sea, however soon after 18:00 a defect was found in the after centrifugal fan spindle in the engine room, so fires were banked. Artificers worked all night to repair the defect. Repairs in the engine room were completed by 17:00 on 12 June. Fires were brought forward in the boilers, and at 19:00, the ship slipped and proceeded out under steam. She proceeded to Portsmouth; travelling 154 nautical miles under steam burning 35 tons 18 cwt (36.5 t) coal for the engines and 6 cwt for the ship. At Portsmouth she saluted the admiral superintendent with 11 guns at 14:35. On 15 June she stowed Whitehead torpedoes. Some torpedoes were fired to test them.

On 16 June she proceeded to Berehaven arriving on the evening of 17 June finding there the Evolutionary Squadron consisting of Minotaur, Hercules, Agincourt, Sultan, Polyphemus, Devastation, Iron Duke, Hotspur, Lord Warden, Repulse, Shannon, Ajax, Penelope, Hecla, Rupert, Cormorant, Conquest, Mercury, Racer, Mariner, Hawke. At 18:30 she saluted the flag of Admiral Sir Geoffrey Phipps Hornby with 17 guns.

Evolutionary Squadron was engaged in what became the first of the Victorian Royal Navy's annual manoeuvres. When the Leander joined on 17 June, she was attached to the ships blockading Berehaven. On 18 June "the weather was so stormy that all exercises were suspended... After sunset, the Conquest, Mercury, Leander, Racer, Cormorant and Mariner with the torpedo boats attached to them got under way top take up their position of observation outside the haven. The weather proved so boisterous that the blockading division returned before it had reached the open water outside. In returning... the Leander, while manoeuvring to keep clear of the Conquest, struck on the Hornet rock, and was seriously injured. As soon as the accident occurred the engines were stopped, the watertight doors closed, the pumps were set going, and collision mats and sails were passed under the ship's bottom. After some time it was found that e pumps failed to gain on the leak. On the following day the ship was moved nearer the shore, so as to be ready to beach in case of necessity. Early, however on the 21st the divers succeeded in finding the leak and stopping it with the patent leak-stopper. The ship's hold was thereupon cleared of water." It was not until 24 June that Leander was ready to go to sea again. On 26 June, the Leander, escorted by the Mercury, arrived at Devonport, where she was placed in dock. The damage to the Leader was described as follows: "The sea entered through numerous rivet holes where rivets had been sheared, but the compartment kept the ship afloat in a working condition." Amongst the stores destroyed by water were 168 lb of soft soap and 400 lb powder (propellant for the guns). The repairs to the ship cost £8,947.

After her brief service with the 1885 Evolutionary Squadron, the Leander served on the China Station.

1889–1892

Leander was re-commissioned at Hong Kong by Captain Burges Watson on 5 April 1889, and served again on the China Station.

1892–1895

Leander was re-commissioned at Hong Kong by Captain William Mc C.F. Castle on 3 May 1892, and served again on the China Station.

1895–1897

The following account of Leanders time in reserve and her refit was written at least 25 years after the event by a retired paymaster officer. In some details this is at variance with the account in the Leander's logbook for 1897 (see next section). 
"The Leander paid off at Chatham after many years in China [in November 1895]. Naturally she was in a bad state, and the Dockyard officers reported her as only fit for C Division of the Reserve; that is to say, she required an extensive refit, which meant landing all her stores and stripping her. This was reported to the Controller [Rear Admiral J.A. Fisher], and he wired back that the Leander was to be paid off into the A Division, meaning that no repairs were to be taken in hand, and that her name would appear in the list of ships ready for sea at forty-eight hours notice. As this was contrary to Regulations, besides being false, a further report was made to the Admiralty. Fisher replied: 'If the dockyard offers will not do as I tell them, I will replace them by others who will.' The Leander paid off all standing, and I was ordered to keep her defect lists and reports of the survey until the Admiralty should be pleased to order them to be taken in hand. After some months [actually 1897] Admiralty orders were received for the Leander to be commissioned by Captain Fegen for the Pacific. We reported that she was unfit to go to sea until refitted. The reply was that the Admiralty orders were to be obeyed. The Leander did commission at Chatham. She got as far as Portsmouth, where Sir Nowel Salmon was Commander-in-Chief, whom Fisher could not bully. the result was that the Leander was detained at Portsmouth to have her necessary defects made good. If anything had happened to her owing to her unseaworthy state, it would have been scandalous."

1897–1901

Leander was commissioned by Captain FF Fegen at Chatham on Tuesday 8 June 1897. On the morning on 11 June, she was moved to No 8 buoy Sheerness, where she was swung to measure the deviation of her magnetic compass. On 16 June she was moved to No 4 Buoy in Little Nore, and the next day to the Downs off Deal. At 2115 on 19 June she weighed anchor and proceeded to Spithead, where she arrived the next day. She remained at Spithead until 2 July, and then went to Berehaven, arriving on 4 July. She left Berehaven on 7 July, going to the rendezvous for manoeuvres. She then stopped at Falmouth Harbour four hours on 11 July. She had gunnery practice on 12 July, expending 25 6-in common shell, 5 6-in shrapnel, 10 6-in blanks, and 27 rounds of 3-pdr Hotchkiss. She then returned to Sheerness arriving on 14 July. On 20 July, dockyard hands started being employed on board each day, finishing on 9 August (including weekends). Typically the number of dockyard hands was between 11 and 22. On 12 August she was reswung at Sheerness, and then she put to sea arriving at Plymouth the next day. She remained at Plymouth until she sailed for Vigo on 19 August, arriving on 22 August. She was again reswung off Vigo on 24 August 1897. She arrived at Valparaiso (Chile) on 28 October. She had gunnery practice again in November 1897, expending 35 cast steel 6-in filled common shell, 5 iron 6-in filled shrapnel shells, 20 3-pdr, 78 cartridges saluting, 2 green very lights, and 1,120 rounds .45" machine gun ball cartridges. The 1900 issue of Jane's Fighting Ships credits her with a crew of 309.

Leander served in the Pacific from 1897 to 1900. A photograph of the Leander taken on 25 June 1897, shows that she still had masts and yards. "In 1900 she did good work during a revolution in Panama in protecting the lives and property of foreign residents." She was paid off at Chatham on 15 January 1901 for refitting.

1901–1904

In 1902 it was decided that Leander was obsolete as a cruiser and should be fitted as a "depôt ship for torpedo boat destroyers" in the Mediterranean. The Leander was reboilered as part of this refit. On 2 May 1902 the Secretary of the Admiralty, Mr Arnold-Forster, was asked in the House of Commons about the choice of boilers. The old boilers were cylindrical single-ended boilers fitted on in 1883. The replacement boilers were of the same type, made by Messrs. J. Brown & Co. of Clydebank. The Leander's refit was again controversial.

1904–1920

The Leander was commissioned as a "depot ship for torpedo boat destroyers" by Captain John M de Robeck on 21 January 1904 (presumably at Chatham). She served as part of the Mediterranean Fleet. On 1 June 1904, de Robeck left the ship as a result of being censured over Leander's refit. De Robeck was put on half-pay.

In March 1904, the Mediterranean Fleet consisted of:
Battleships: Albemarle, Bulwark, Duncan, Exmouth, Formidable, Illustrious, Implacable, Irresistible, London, Montagu, Renown, Russell, Venerable
Armoured cruisers: Aboukir, Bacchante
Protected cruisers: Arrogant, Diana, Furious, Hermione, Intrepid, Mohawk, Naiad, Pandora, Pegasus, Pioneer, Pyramus, Surprise
Torpedo Boat Destroyers (TBD): Albatross, Ariel, Banshee, Bat, Bruizer, Chamois, Crane, Cygnet, Cynthia, Desperate, Fawn, Flying Fish, Griffon, Kangaroo, Mallard, Myrmidon, Orwell, Panther, Seal, Stag, Thrasher
Torpedo Gunboats (TGB): Dryad, Harrier, Hussar, Speedy
Torpedo Boat Carrier: Vulcan
Torpedo Boat Destroyer Depot Ship: Leander
Depot ships: Hibernia, Tyne, Cormorant
Yacht: Imogene

Leander had as tender to her the depot ship Tyne, and the torpedo boat destroyers: Albatross, Ariel, Banshee, Bat, Bruizer, Chamois, Crane, Cynthia, Desperate, Fawn, Flying Fish, Griffon, Kangaroo, Mallard, Myrmidon, Orwell, Panther, Seal, Stag and Thrasher.

Leander continued in commission as a depot ship for destroyers until December 1919, and was at Scapa Flow during the First World War.

She was sold on 1 July 1920.

Footnotes

References
 Blueprints
 The Naval Annual, various issues.
 Chesneau, Roger, and Eugene M. Kolesnik, eds. All the World's Fighting Ships 1860–1905, published Conway Maritime Press, 1979. 
 Jane, Fred T All the World's Fighting Ships, 1900
 Martin, Paymaster Rear Admiral W.E.R. The Adventures of a Naval Paymaster, pub Mayflower Press, some time after 1922.
 The UK National Maritime Museum has papers dated 1885 - 1907 relating to Tristan Dannreuther's appointments to HMS Brittania, HMS Garnet, HMS Inflexible, HMS Foxhound, HMS Melita, HMS President, HMS Pembroke, HMS Leander, HMS Hood, HMS Leviathan, HMS Bachante, HMS Roxburgh, HMS Vindictive, HMS Aboukir, HMS Amphitrite and HMS Kent.
The Churchill Archive has logbooks by Bryan Godfrey-Faussett, dated 1 January 1885 – 31 December 1885 covering his time at R.N. College Portsmouth, and serving on HMS Nautilus and HMS Leander, and dated 23 January 1885 – 27 October 1886 covering his time serving on HMS Leander and HMS Agamemnon (Mediterranean Station).

Logbooks in the UK National Archives

Leander-class cruisers (1882)
Ships built on the River Clyde
1882 ships